The  was an electric multiple unit (EMU) train type that was operated by the private railway operator Nishi-Nippon Railroad (Nishitetsu) in Japan on the Nishitetsu Tenjin Ōmuta Line from 1989 to 2017.

Design
Six 8000 series trains were built by Kawasaki Heavy Industries in 1989; the first three sets were constructed in February 1989, with the other three sets constructed in April the same year.

Unlike most trains made during this period, the 8000 series uses resistor control, something which would have been classified as obsolete during the time due to the advent of the variable-frequency drive. Initially, there were plans for the 8000 series to use a control method other than resistor control, but due to a combination of factors, the idea was soon dropped.

Operations
The 8000 series trains operated on the Nishitetsu Tenjin Ōmuta and Dazaifu Lines and were mainly used on limited express services.

Formations
The six six-car sets are formed as follows with four motored ("M") cars and two trailer ("Tc") cars, with car number 1 facing the Ōmuta end and car number 6 facing the Nishitetsu Fukuoka (Tenjin) or Dazaifu end.

Cars 2 and 5 have two lozenge-type pantographs each.

Interior
Both types of seats have the same wine-colored upholstery with a checkered pattern.

Conversions

Tabito excursion train
This was a six-car set converted from 8000 series set 8051 in 2014. The Tabito set differs from a normal 8000 series set by its livery and certain changes to its interior, such as the addition of a cabinet and a table with some leaflets in car number 3. This set entered service on 22 March 2014, and was withdrawn from service on 16 September 2017; the set was replaced with a 3000 series set with a similar livery. A handing over ceremony was later held at Fukuoka (Tenjin) Station after the 8000 series Tabito set completed its last run.

Following its retirement from the Tabito service, the special livery it used was removed and it was returned to its original colors of beige with red accents, and was almost fully restored back to its original condition. The set was then used for a few more special runs before being finally withdrawn on 15 October 2017.

Suito excursion train
This was a six-car set converted from 8000 series set 8061 in 2015. The Suito set differs from a normal 8000 series set by its livery and certain changes to its interior, such as the addition of a table with commemorative stamp pads and a cabinet displaying antiques in car number 3. This set entered service on 4 October 2015 and was retired on 22 July 2017 due to aging; the set was replaced by a 3000 series set with a similar livery. As with the Tabito set, the Suito set was used for a special final run from Chikushi to Fukuoka (Tenjin) on 22 July 2017, with a handing over ceremony taking place at Fukuoka (Tenjin). After its final run, the set made its way to the Chikushi Depot.

History
The trains were constructed in 1989 as the third generation of limited express trains on the Nishi-Nippon Railway, following in the footsteps of the older 1000 series and 2000 series, with the latter already being 15 years old by the time the 8000 series were introduced.

Two sets were converted to excursion trains in 2014 and 2015, and were used until 2017. The last remaining set, 8051, was used for a special final run on 15 October 2017, from Nishitetsu Fukuoka (Tenjin) to Chikushi Station, following which, the 8000 series was officially withdrawn. After its run from Nishitetsu Fukuoka (Tenjin) to Chikushi, the set made its way to the Nishitetsu Train Festival at Chikushi Depot, where it was exhibited. No 8000 series cars have been preserved.

References

External links

 Nishitetsu 8000 series information 

Electric multiple units of Japan
Nishi-Nippon Railroad
Train-related introductions in 1989
1500 V DC multiple units of Japan
Kawasaki multiple units